Oliver Frank (1 September 1963 – 25 February 2022) was a German singer. He died in Göttingen on 25 February 2022, at the age of 58.

Discography

Singles
Abschied von Fernando („…und fährt ein weißes Schiff vorbei“) / Wohin Du auch gehst (1985)
Im Hafen von Piräus / Ich träum schon mit offenen Augen von dir (1985)
Palermo bei Nacht / Montego Bay (1986)
1000 und 1 Nacht / Roter Stern von Mexiko (1987)
Santa Barbara / Wie ein Stern am Himmel (1988)
Bambolero / Angelina (1988)
Rendezvous im Paradies / Hello, Baby Blue (1989)
S.O.S. am Strand in Griechenland / Mit Dir (1989)
Katharina / Hello, Baby Blue (1990)
Zum Frühstück nach Paris / Leih mir noch mal Deine Liebe (1990)
Liza Maria / Leben mit Dir (1990)
Nichts als die Wahrheit (2005)

Albums
Santa Barbara (1990)
Samstag Nacht (1993)
Rendez-vous im Paradies (1994)
Alles klar! (1996)
Alles klar! II (1997)
Alles klar! – Die Maxis (1998)
Das Beste von Oliver Frank (1998)
Knall auf Fall (1999)
Hautnah (2001)
Italienische Sehnsucht „Die Fanedition!“ (2002)
Oliver Frank „XXL – Die Remixe“ (2002)
Land in Sicht (2003)
Best of – Die Italo-Sommer-Edition (2004)
Küsse und mehr (2007)
Mega-Mix (2007)
Gold-Collection (2007)
Unverbesserlich (2009)
Ich wette auf Dich und mich – Das Beste aus 25 Jahren Oliver Frank! (2010)
Jetzt oder nie (2011)
Saitenblicke (2015)
My Star – Oliver Frank (2017)

Awards
Most Popular Pop Singer (Westdeutsche Allgemeine Zeitung, 1994)

References

External links
 
 

1963 births
2022 deaths
German male singers
Musicians from Göttingen